Efros is a surname. Notable people with the name include:

Alexei A. Efros, American computer scientist
Alexei L. Efros, American physicist
Anatoly Efros, Russian and Soviet theatre producer
Cristian Efros, Moldavian footballer
Leonid Efros, Russian painter

See also
Mirele Efros, an 1898 Yiddish play by Jacob Gordin